Sisillius I (Welsh: Seisyll) was a legendary king of the Britons as accounted by Geoffrey of Monmouth.  He was preceded by Gurgustius and succeeded by Jago. He was the father of Kimarcus, king of the Britons, and shares his name with one of the sons of Ebraucus, and two later kings of the same name (Sisillius II and Sisillius III). Geoffrey has nothing to say of him beyond this.

Notes

Legendary British kings